Hey Marseilles is an indie folk and chamber pop band from Seattle, Washington founded in 2006.

History
The band self-released its first album in 2008 and opened early in its career for groups such as Mt. St. Helens Vietnam Band and Parts & Labor. This album was reissued in 2010. A second album, Lines We Trace, arrived in 2013. They then met Anthony Kilhoffer, an LA-based producer and engineer in 2013. Kilhoffer decided to work with them in producing their third album, Hey Marseilles.

Band members
Matt Bishop – lead vocals, acoustic guitar
Nick Ward – guitar, mandolin
Philip Kobernik – accordion, piano
Samuel Anderson – cello, electric bass 
Jacob Anderson – viola

Discography
Albums
 2008: To Travels and Trunks (Self-released)
 2013: Lines We Trace (Thirty Tigers)
 2016: Hey Marseilles (Shanachie Records/Dine Alone Records)

Singles
"Rio" (2008)
"To Travels and Trunks" (2010)
"West Coast" (2015)

References

External links

Musical groups from Seattle
American folk musical groups